The Timan-Pechora Basin is a sedimentary basin located between Timan Ridge and the Ural Mountains in northern Russia. The basin contains oil and gas fields.

Oil and gas extraction 
A planned project to mine its oil and gas was conceived in the mid-1990s and approved by United States and Russian Governments.  As of September 29, 2004, Conoco and LUKoil planned to jointly develop this Basin.

Since 2004 the production increased and the importance for LUKoil increased. However, the production began to decline in 2010. Large investments are needed to increase production rates or at least to maintain production at levels over 17 million tons annually.

Oil extraction has produced limited environmental damage. In particular it has caused eutrophication and organic contamination of waters as interpreted from low diatom diversity and absence of pollution sensitive diatoms among other things. Possibly oil extraction is also behind lower avian diversity at some locations as transport activity might have disturbed wildlife. Despite this much of the Pechora region can be described as "semi-pristine" from an ecological point of view.

In a 2018 assessment, the United States Geological Survey estimated for undiscovered, technically recoverable continuous resources, the mean totals for the region are 1,425 million barrels of shale oil, or 1.4 billion barrels of oil; 45,721 billion cubic feet, or 46 trillion cubic feet of gas; and 737 million barrels of natural gas liquids.

See also

 Trebs and Titov oil fields
 Pechora coal basin

References

External links
"Joint U.S. - Russian Statement In Support of the Timan Pechora Project" from the White House Office of the Press Secretary on September 28, 1994
"Conoco in Russia" at the Moscow International Petroleum Club
Map of the Timan Pechora Hydrocarbon Region at Blackbourn Geoconsulting
"Oil giants ready to battle for Rosneft" from the CIS Oil & Gas Report in December 1997

Foreland basins
Geology of European Russia
Oil fields of Russia
Sedimentary basins of Russia
Lukoil